The 32nd South American Junior Championships in Athletics were held in São Leopoldo, Brazil at the University of Unisinos Track club from October 7–8, 2000.  Athletes from Portugal were invited to participate as guests.

Participation (unofficial)

Detailed result lists can be found on the CBAt, on the IAAF and on the "World Junior Athletics History" website.  An unofficial count (without the Portuguese guest athletes) yields the number of about 260 athletes from about 11 countries:  Argentina (53), Bolivia (3), Brazil (66), Chile (46), Colombia (8), Ecuador (16), Panama (2), Paraguay (24), Peru (3), Uruguay (14), Venezuela (25).

Medal summary
Medal winners are published for men and women
Complete results can be found on the CBAt, on the IAAF and on the "World Junior Athletics History"
website.

Men

Women

Medal table (unofficial)

Final scoring per countries

Final scoring per countries were published.

Overall

Men

Women

References

External links
World Junior Athletics History

South American U20 Championships in Athletics
2000 in Brazilian sport
South American U20 Championships
International athletics competitions hosted by Brazil
2000 in youth sport